Luis de la Rosa is a Mexican actor, best known for his role as Mexican singer  Luis Miguel as a teenager in the biographical drama series Luis Miguel: The Series, and as Bruno Riquelme de la Mora in The House of Flowers, both productions of Netflix. Subsequently, he had a leading role in the 2019 Mexican film Un papá pirata.

Career 
De la Rosa was studying in Canada. He started acting in 2017 by doing the play Les Misérables in his school, where he played Gavroche. Subsequently, he was chosen by the producer of the film Mientras el lobo no está.

Filmography

References

External links 
 

Living people
Mexican male film actors
Mexican male telenovela actors
2001 births